The Ethiopian striped mouse or striped-back mouse (Mus imberbis) is a species of rodent in the family Muridae.
It is only found in Ethiopia. It was formerly classified in the monotypic genus Muriculus, but phylogenetic evidence supports Muriculus being a subgenus within Mus, the true mice. The Ethiopian striped mouse's natural habitats are subtropical or tropical high-altitude grassland and urban areas.
It is threatened by habitat loss.

References

Endemic fauna of Ethiopia
Old World rats and mice
Mammals of Ethiopia
Mammals described in 1842
Taxonomy articles created by Polbot

Mus (rodent)
Taxa named by Eduard Rüppell
Taxobox binomials not recognized by IUCN